St. Nicholas is an unincorporated community in Luxemburg Township, Stearns County, Minnesota, United States.  The community is located along Stearns County Road 21 near Stearns County Road 165.

References

Unincorporated communities in Stearns County, Minnesota
Unincorporated communities in Minnesota